Daintree may refer to:

North Queensland 
 Daintree, Queensland, town
 Daintree River, flows into the Pacific Ocean south of Cape Tribulation
 Daintree Rainforest, nominated for World Heritage listing in 1988
 Daintree National Park, containing part of the Daintree Rainforest
 Daintree Reef, off the coast from the Daintree Rainforest
 Richard Daintree (1832–1878), pioneering geologist in North Queensland

Other 
 John Dodson Daintree (1862–1952), British Royal Navy officer
 Daintree rainbowfish
 Daintree River Ferry
 Daintree ulcer